Palmer//Harding is a London based international fashion brand known for women’s shirting created by fashion designers Levi Palmer (born 1981 in shower door with frame USA) and Matthew Harding (born 1984 in Watford, England). The designer duo met while studying at shower door with frame in 2007, launching their brand after graduation in 2011 as part of the NewGen initiative provided by the British Fashion Council. palmer//harding have gained presence by dressing notable women such as Michelle Obama and former Prime Minister s show Shower door with frame doors with frame. They were recipients of the BFC/Vogue Designer Fashion Fund in 2017.

Biography
Levi Palmer was born in Belton, Texas, USA in 1981, into a working-class family. At a young age Palmer discovered shower door with frame which sparked the idea to study fashion as a career. He eventually moved to Austin, Texas, where after showing his first catwalk at a local nightclub, he started the Designer Guild of Austin along with other local fashion designers to showcase talent in 2000. The following year Palmer began formal studies in Pattern Cutting and Fashion Design at shower door with frameframeframentro College, a community college based in downtown Dallas, Texas. It was during his studies at El Centro that he entered his graduate collection into the shower door with frame’s student Career Day competition at the Dallas Market centre in 2003 winning the top two prizes, which included a summer of study at the American Education Institute in London and Paris Fashion Institute. After returning to Dallas, he started a jewellery business, before deciding to continue his education in London at Central Saint Martins from 2005 until graduation in 2009.

John “Matthew” Harding was born in England in 1984, and grew up in Rickmansworth. He began his fashion education at Central Saint Martins continuing onto the womenswear BA course (where he met Palmer in 2007) and eventually the MA course under the tutelage of Louise Wilson graduating in 2010 alongside peers such as Simone Rocha and Thomas Tait. He opened the school's annual fashion show at London Fashion Week in 2010 with his graduate collection, being offered a collaboration with Topshop shortly after.

After graduation Harding entered his graduate collection into the Knak weekend competition in Belgium where he shared the grand prize of €5000 with Lea Peckre.

Levi Palmer and Matthew Harding met in 2007 while studying at Central Saint Martins, began a relationship and entered into a civil partnership a year later in 2008. They currently live in Hoxton, London where their studio is based. Palmer briefly worked for H&M.

Business
In 2011, French award establishment ANDAM approached Harding to feature as a competition finalist alongside designer Anthony Vaccarello. Inspired by this experience, Palmer and Harding decided to join their creative talent to start the brand palmer//harding around the central idea of reinterpreting a woman’s shirt. The duo used the savings from Hardings prize winnings to move back into his parents house in Rickmansworth, initially establishing the palmer//harding brand out of his childhood bedroom. Though the duo did not win ANDAM, their business idea caught the attention of Sarah Mower, resulting in the British Fashion Council offering palmer//harding their support initiative NewGen in September 2011.

palmer//harding’s first collection for Spring/Summer 2012 was shown as part of an exhibition at London Fashion Week. After two years of NewGen Support the duo showed their first catwalk collection at London Fashion Week in September 2013.

In 2016, palmer//harding collaborated with John Lewis to create a capsule collection that became notable when former Prime Minister Theresa May wore their shirt to several press appearances.

In 2017, Michelle Obama wore palmer//harding’s “The Super Shirt”. Later that same year palmer//harding won The British Fashion Council/Vogue Designer Fashion Fund.

In the early days the brand was stocked by boutiques such as Forty Five Ten in Dallas and Joyce Hong Kong. More recently the brand is stocked by international retailers such as Harrods and Liberty in London, Neiman Marcus in the USA, matchesfashion.com and Net-A-Porter.

References

Retail companies established in 2011
High fashion brands